Barra Mansa Futebol Clube, commonly known as Barra Mansa, is a Brazilian football club based in Barra Mansa, Rio de Janeiro state. They competed in the Série C once.

History
The club was founded on November 15, 1908. Barra Mansa won the Campeonato Fluminense in 1953, and the special edition of that competition in the same year. They won the Campeonato Carioca Second level in 1995. Barra Mansa competed in the Série C in 1996, when they were eliminated in the First Stage.

Achievements

 Campeonato Fluminense:
 Winners (2): 1953, 1953 special competition
 Campeonato Carioca Série A2:
 Winners (2): 1995, 2014

Stadium
Barra Mansa Futebol Clube play their home games at Estádio Leão do Sul. The stadium has a maximum capacity of 12,000 people.

References

External links
 Official website

Association football clubs established in 1908
Football clubs in Rio de Janeiro (state)
1908 establishments in Brazil